Ilan Benjamin Sauter (born 6 February 2001) is a Swiss footballer who plays as a leftback for Zürich.

Early life
Born in New York City, Sauter moved to Switzerland aged 6, where he started playing for his local club FC Maur. At the age of 10, he moved to the youth academy of FC Zürich and was promoted to the first team in 2019, at the age of 18.

Professional career
Sauter made his professional debut for Zürich in a 4-0 Swiss Super League loss to BSC Young Boys on 24 August 2019.

In August 2020, Sauter joined Swiss club Wil on loan from Zürich. On 10 July 2021, the loan was extended for the 2021–22 season.

References

External links
 
 FCZ Profile
 SFL Profile
 SFV U16 Profile
 SFV U17 Profile
 SFV U18 Profile

2001 births
Soccer players from New York City
American people of Swiss descent
Living people
Swiss men's footballers
Switzerland youth international footballers
American soccer players
Association football fullbacks
FC Zürich players
FC Wil players
Swiss Super League players
Swiss Challenge League players